A Day to Remember is a 1953 British comedy drama film directed by Ralph Thomas and starring an ensemble cast including Stanley Holloway, Donald Sinden, James Hayter and Bill Owen.

Plot
The darts team of a London public house go on a day trip to Boulogne-sur-Mer in France. On the eve of their visit to France, the members of the Hand & Flower pub darts team gather for a drink. The day trip has been organised by one of the team, Percy, who is a travel agent. For some of the team, it is their first ever trip abroad, while for others it is the first time they have returned to France since their service in World War I or World War II. Charley is looking forward to meeting some French mademoiselles, but Fred, the pub's married landlord, says there'll be none of that sort of thing. Stan has a plan to buy watches in France and smuggle them back into Britain, avoiding customs duty. Jim is going through a rocky patch with his fiancée, whom he suspects considers him to be boring and staid.

The following day, the group meet at London Victoria station and catch the boat train to Folkestone Harbour station for the ferry across the English Channel to Boulogne-sur-Mer. Once they have landed in France, despite the insistence of Fred that they stick together, Jim departs to visit the area where he had been involved in heavy fighting during 1944 when British troops had arrived to liberate France. In the local florists, the shop owners refuse to take his money for flowers for his friend's grave. After taking them to the cemetery where his comrade is buried, he visits a local farm and meets Martine, with whom he spent time eight years before when she was eleven. Now an attractive young woman, she recognises him and invites him to have lunch with her family who also remember him. They immediately strike up a chemistry, which his relationship with his fiancée in England lacks. However, Martine is engaged to a local lawyer who is expecting to land a prestigious partnership in Paris.

Back in town, the rest of the group enjoy lunch in a cafe and then separate to tour around the town. Stan goes and picks up his black market watches, while "Shorty", stewing over those who use his resented nickname, gets drunk and joins the French Foreign Legion, in spite of Charley's efforts to stop him. Fred is enticed by a young woman into a bar and she persuades him to buy champagne for them and dance with her. He is embarrassed when Charley finds him in there. Percy, the travel agent, becomes violently homesick and desperate for a cup of tea.

Reassembling, the group attempt but fail to retrieve Shorty from service in the Foreign Legion, and then drift towards the docks and the ship for the return trip, wondering what has happened to Jim who has been missing all day. Stan sees a policeman calling to him, so, thinking he knows about the watches, throws them into the water; but he only wants to return Stan's passport which he had left at the customs check.

Jim has fallen in love with Martine, but they argue over whether they can be together, and he heads for the docks, while Martine goes to rejoin her fiancée. But once there, she tells him she does not love him and cannot marry him, and then drives hurriedly towards the docks. Meanwhile, on a blind date with a friend, Jim's fiancée in London has met and struck up a relationship with an American serviceman. Arriving as his ship is leaving, Martine shouts her true feelings for Jim, and they agree to meet again when he returns to France.

Cast
Stanley Holloway as Charley Porter
Donald Sinden as Jim Carver
Joan Rice as Vera Mitchell
Odile Versois as Martine Berthier
James Hayter as Fred Collins
Harry Fowler as Stan Harvey
Edward Chapman as Mr. Robinson
Peter Jones as Percy Goodall
Bill Owen as "Shorty" Sharpe
Meredith Edwards as Bert Tripp
George Coulouris as Foreign Legion Captain.
Vernon Gray as Marvin
Thora Hird as Mrs. Trott
Theodore Bikel as Henri Dubot
Brenda De Banzie as Mrs. Collins
Lily Kann as Martine's Grandmother
 Georgette Anys as Jeanne Sautet 
 Marianne Stone as Doreen
Shirley Eaton as Young Woman on Ferry (uncredited)
 Jacques Cey as Maurice

Production
The film was based on The Hand and Flower, a 1952 novel by Jerrard Tickell, who had written Appointment with Venus, also filmed by Betty Box and Ralph Thomas. It was partly filmed on location in Boulogne.

References

External links

A Day to Remember at Britmovie

1953 films
1950s English-language films
Films based on Irish novels
1953 comedy-drama films
Films set in France
Films set in London
Films directed by Ralph Thomas
Films scored by Clifton Parker
Films shot at Pinewood Studios
British comedy-drama films
Films produced by Betty Box
British black-and-white films
1950s British films